Multisite-specific tRNA:(cytosine-C5)-methyltransferase (multisite-specific tRNA:m5C-methyltransferase, TRM4 (gene)) is an enzyme with systematic name S-adenosyl-L-methionine:tRNA (cytosine-C5)-methyltransferase. This enzyme catalyses the following chemical reaction

 (1) S-adenosyl-L-methionine + cytosine34 in tRNA precursor  S-adenosyl-L-homocysteine + 5-methylcytosine34 in tRNA precursor
 (2) S-adenosyl-L-methionine + cytosine40 in tRNA precursor  S-adenosyl-L-homocysteine + 5-methylcytosine40 in tRNA precursor
 (3) S-adenosyl-L-methionine + cytosine48 in tRNA  S-adenosyl-L-homocysteine + 5-methylcytosine48 in tRNA
 (4) S-adenosyl-L-methionine + cytosine49 in tRNA  S-adenosyl-L-homocysteine + 5-methylcytosine49 in tRNA

The enzyme from Saccharomyces cerevisiae is responsible for complete 5-methylcytosine methylations of yeast tRNA.

References

External links 
 

EC 2.1.1